Frederick William Engdahl (born August 9, 1944) is an American writer based in Germany. He identifies himself as an "economic researcher, historian and freelance journalist."

Early life and education 
Born in Minneapolis, Minnesota, United States, Engdahl is the son of F. William Engdahl Sr., and Ruth Aalund (b. Rishoff). Engdahl grew up in Texas and earned a degree in engineering from Princeton University in 1966 (BA) followed by graduate study in comparative economics at the University of Stockholm from 1969 to 1970. He then worked as an economist and freelance journalist in New York and in Europe.

Career 
Engdahl began writing about oil politics with the first oil shock in the early 1970s. He has also been a long-time associate of the LaRouche movement and served as an economics editor for LaRouche's Executive Intelligence Review.

His first book, entitled A Century of War: Anglo-American Oil Politics and the New World Order, discusses the alleged roles of Zbigniew Brzezinski and George Ball and of the USA in the 1979 overthrow of the Shah of Iran, which was meant to manipulate oil prices and to stop Soviet expansion. Engdahl says that Brzezinski and Ball used the Islamic Balkanization model proposed by Bernard Lewis. In 2007, he completed Seeds of Destruction: The Hidden Agenda of Genetic Manipulation, in which he criticized Monsanto's strategy with GMO seeds, such as Roundup Ready soybeans. He has also written for newsmagazines such as the Asia Times.

Engdahl is a contributor to the Global Research website of the conspiracist Centre for Research on Globalization, the Russian website New Eastern Outlook, and Veterans Today (on whose advisory board he sits). He is a regular contributor to RT (formerly Russia Today) and Voice of Russia. He is on the scientific committee of the journals Geopolitica, alongside Michel Chossudovsky and others, and Eurasia, alongside Aleksandr Dugin and others. He was a keynote speaker at the conference "Geopolitics of Multipolarity", held at Moscow State University in 2011, alongside Dugin.

Personal life
William Engdahl has been married since 1987 and has been living for more than two decades near Frankfurt am Main, Germany.

Beliefs

George Soros conspiracies
Engdahl has written of the alleged secret power of Jewish financiers such as George Soros and the Rothschilds. Author Michael Wohlraich identifies Engdahl as the first US populariser of Soros conspiracy theories: In 1996, he wrote in the Executive Intelligence Review that "The most important of such 'Jews who are not Jews,' are the Rothschilds, who launched Soros’s career. Soros is American only in his passport," which has been described by the anti-fascist group Unicorn Riot as "an example of the anti-Semitic "rootless cosmopolitan" trope.

Abiogenic petroleum 

Engdahl stated in 2007 that he had come to believe that petroleum is of geological origin, a view contrary to the scientific understanding that it is of biological origin. He believes oil to be produced from carbon, by forces of heat and pressure deep underground. Engdahl calls himself an "ex peak oil believer", stating that peak oil is actually a political phenomenon known as petrodollar warfare.

Skepticism of global warming 
Engdahl argued that the problem of global warming is much exaggerated. He claims that global warming is merely a "scare" and a "thinly veiled attempt to misuse climate to argue for a new Malthusian reduction of living standards for the majority of the world while a tiny elite gains more power."

Greater Middle East Project theories 
According to Engdahl, the ultimate goal of the US is to take the resources of Africa and Middle East under military control to block economic growth in China and Russia.

CIA role in global politics 
Al-Monitor has described how in August 2016 Engdahl told a right-wing Russian think tank that "Former vice chairman of the National Intelligence Council of the CIA, Graham E. Fuller, was on Princes' Islands, 20 minutes from Istanbul, the entire night of the coup, monitoring developments until the coup collapsed" - when in fact Fuller was in Washington. Al-Monitor describe Engdahl's intervention as part of a collaborative Russian-Turkish disinformation campaign.

Selected publications 
 A Classical KGB Disinformation Campaign: Who Killed Olof Palme?, with Goran Haglund, William Jones, and Paolo Serri. EIR Special Report (1986).
 A Century of War: Anglo-American Oil Politics and the New World Order. London: Pluto (2004), revised ed. ; Progressive Press (2012). .
 Seeds of Destruction. The Hidden Agenda of Genetic Manipulation. Centre for Research on Globalization (2007). .
 Full Spectrum Dominance: Totalitarian Democracy in the New World Order. Boxboro, Mass.: Third Millennium Press (2009). ; Progressive Press (2011). .
 Gods of Money: Wall Street and the Death of the American Century. Wiesbaden: edition.engdahl (2010). ; Progressive Press (2011). .
 Myths, Lies and Oil Wars. Wiesbaden: edition.engdahl (2012). .
 Target: China -- How Washington and Wall Street Plan to Cage the Asian Dragon. San Diego, Calif.: Progressive Press (2014). German and Chinese editions (2013).
 The Lost Hegemon: Whom the Gods Would Destroy. Wiesbaden: mine.books (2016).
 Manifest Destiny: Democracy as Cognitive Dissonance. Wiesbaden: mine.books (2018). .

See also
 Seeds of Destruction: Hidden Agenda of Genetic Manipulation

References

External links 
 Official site
 William Engdahl at IMDb
 Video interviews with Engdahl on The Real News

1944 births
American economics writers
American emigrants to Germany
American male non-fiction writers
American political writers
LaRouche movement
Living people
Princeton University alumni
Stockholm University alumni
American conspiracy theorists